Pycnomerus depressiusculus is a species of beetle in family Zopheridae. It is found in the Palearctic

References

Zopheridae
Beetles described in 1846